Croix-des-Bouquets Arrondissement is an arrondissement in the Ouest Department of Haiti. As of 2015, the population was 474,806 inhabitants. Postal codes in the Croix-des-Bouquets Arrondissement start with the number 63.

The arondissement consists of the following communes:
 Croix-des-Bouquets
 Thomazeau
 Ganthier
 Fonds-Verrettes
 Cornillon
 Canaan

References

Arrondissements of Haiti
Ouest (department)